Professional Golfers Association may refer to:

 Professional Golfers' Association (Great Britain and Ireland)
 Professional Golfers' Association of America